The railway stations in Ghana serve a rail network concentrated in the south of the country.

Maps 
 UNHCR Atlas Map Ghana - shows Topography.
 UN Map Ghana - shows Provinces
 GhanaNet Map

Towns served by rail

Existing 

The following towns or villages currently have or had rail service in Ghana;  gauge unless otherwise noted :

East 
 Accra - (E) - port, capital city: Accra Central Station  
 Baatsona
 Asoprochona - suburban terminus 
 Koforidua  (E)
 Pokoasi - (E/C) - junction
 Shai Hills - (E)
 Tema - (E) - port in east - proposed suburban terminus 2008 

 Nsawam - (E)
 Koforidua (E)
 Nkawkaw - (E)
 Ejisu - (E)
 Nsuta  
 Juaso (C)
 Konongo, Ghana (E)
 Boankra (E) - inland port
 Kumasi (E/W) - junction 

 Nsuta (E)
 Bososo (E) 

 Anyinam

West 

 Sekondi - (W) - older port and workshops
 Tarkwa - (W) - junction 
 Takoradi - (W) - newer port
 Huni Valley - (W/C) - junction on west line for cross country line to east line; concrete sleeper plant
 Dunkwa - (W) - Junction for Awaso
 Obuasi - (W) 85.5 km
 Bekwai - (W)
 Kumasi - (W/E) junction 0.0 km

 Tarkwa - (W) - junction 
 Prestea - branch terminus - (W)

 Dunkwa - (W) - Junction for Awaso
 Awaso - (W) - branch terminus - Bauxite mine

Centre 
 Huni Valley - (W/C) - junction
 Twifu Praso 
 Foso (C)
 Achissi - (C) - junction
 Akim Oda - (C) - 
 Kade - (C) - branch terminus (o/o/u)
 Akoroso (C)
 Pokoasi  
 Kotoku - (E/C) - junction

Eastern Border 
  gauge
  Lomé - 
   - border
  Aflao - Diamond Cement Ghana Limited factory at Aflao to the Lomé Port is expected to be completed in early 2014.

Proposed 
This list includes regauged stations.

Far Northern Line (West) 
(far western line) 
 Takoradi - port - break of gauge /
   Manso 
  Tarkwa  - junction for northwest
  Huni Valley 
  Dunkwa
  Awaso 
  Nyinahim 
  Sunyani (regional capital Brong-Ahafo)
  Techiman - junction
  Bole
  Salwa
  Wa (regional capital Upper West Region)
  Hamile - northwest terminus - 
 Border -
  Burkina Faso
  Ouagadougou - junction

Far Northern Line (East) 
  under construction 2020
  Tema - Port
  Akosombo
  Ho (regional capital Volta Region)
  Hohoe
  Bimbila
  Yendi
  Tamale (regional capital Northern Region)
  Bolgatanga (regional capital Upper East Region)
  Paga (0 km)
 - - Border (Ghana-Burkina Faso) 
  Dakola
  Po
  Bagre
  Ouagadougou - junction - national capital (166 km) (1000 km from Tema)

 Nsuta

 (Suburban)
  Dansoman
  La, Ghana
  Teshie, Ghana

ECOWAS Coastal Line 
 (proposed 2010) 
  Aflao - near border in east with Togo, and capital Lomé.
   Togo-Ghana border
  Tema 
  Accra - national capital
  Winneba
  Cape Coast (regional capital Central Region, Ghana)
  Takoradi (regional capital Western Region, Ghana)
  Omanpe
   Ghana-Côte d'Ivoire border

Approved 

 Kumasi - (W/E) junction (2010)
 Bolgatanga 
 Navrongo 
 Paga - near Burkina Faso

 Takoradi
 Manso
 Huni Valley
 Tarkwa
 Dunkwa–Awaso
 Nyinahin 
 Sunyani 
 Techiman
 Bole 
 Salwa
 Wa 
 Hamile 

(far eastern line)
 Ejisu 
 Mampong
 Nkoranza
 Tamale  - junction
 Bolgatanga 
 Paga - near Burkina Faso
 Tamale
 Yendi 
 Shieni - iron ore
 Buipe  - just north of lake
 Lake Volta

Suburban 

(Suburban line)
 Accra
 Sakumono 
 Asoprochona
 Tema - large port to east of Accra 
 Kasoa
 Winneba - west of Accra on coast.
 Madina

Lake Volta branch to east:

 Achimota  (E) - junction
 Tema (E) - major port 
 Sugbaniate (E)
 Shai Hills (E)
 Akosombo (E) - inland lake port

Rehab 2008 

 Kumasi to Paga 
 Yendi branch. 
 Takoradi through Kumasi
 Awaso branch

 Bosusi
 Kibi - bauxite deposit

 Baatsonaa and Nungua bridge repairs complete

Other 

 Kumasi, Boankra inland port, Kumasi-Paga through Buipe, to connect the Volta lake, Achimota-Tema port, Tamale-Yendi to connect Shieni (227m) iron deposit, Bosusi-Kibi to connect the bauxite deposit at Kibi and branch lines linking the towns where other mineral deposits have been identified.
 Takoradi through Manso, Tarkwa, Huni Valley, Dunkwa Awaso, Nyinahin, Sunyani, Techiman, Bole, Sawla, Wa through to Hamile in the Upper West Region of Ghana.
 Ghana Railway Development Authority has invited bids to convert the 950 km rail network from  narrow gauge to standard gauge, permitting 25 tonne axleloads and increasing speeds from 56 to 160 km/h. In the longer term, feasibility studies will look at introducing a suburban rail service from Accra to Kasoa, Winneba and Madina, as well as extending the railway to the north and connecting with the proposed Ecowas rail line across West Africa.

Closed 

 Kade

Timeline

2020 
 83.5 km 
 Kumasi-Paja design 
 Accra-Kumasi

2019 
 Ghana - Burkino Faso 
 Western line

201? 
 Accra
 Avenor, Ghana

 Nsawam
 Kumasi

 Ejisu
 Tamale
 Paga

 Yendi

2010 
 Ghana proposes part of the ECOWAS Coastal Railway linking Aflao-Tema-Accra, Winneba, Cape Coast, Takoradi and Omape.
 The Government of Ghana and the China National Machinery Import and Export Corporation (CMC) has signed a US $6.050 billion contract agreement for the construction of a railway infrastructure from Nsawam near Accra via Kumasi to Paga on the Burkina Faso border, and a branch from same at Tamale to Yendi.

2009 

 Ghana Railway Development Authority invites bids to convert the 950 km network to standard gauge 
 Ghana plans major rail rehabilitation

Standards 

 Couplings : AAR
 Brakes : Air

See also 

 Rail transport in Ghana
 Rail transport in Burkina Faso
 Transport in Ghana
 Ghana Railway Corporation
 Ghana
 List of countries by rail transport network size
 Railway stations in Togo
 ECOWAS rail

References

External links 
 Ghana-Net
 Rehabilitation and expansion of Ghana Railways

 
Railway stations
Railway stations